Dragosloveni may refer to:

Dragosloveni, a village in Dumbrăveni, Vrancea, Romania
Dragosloveni, a village in Soveja Commune, Vrancea County, Romania

See also 
 Drăgoiești (disambiguation)
 Drago (disambiguation)